WVMT (620 AM) is a commercial radio station licensed to Burlington, Vermont, and serving the Champlain Valley of Vermont and New York.  WVMT is simulcast on FM translator station W242BK at 96.3 MHz.  The translator's owner, Vox AM/FM, LLC, operates WVMT under a local marketing agreement (LMA) and is in the process of acquiring it from local businessman Paul S. Goldman. The radio studios and offices are within Fort Ethan Allen in Colchester, with Vox's other stations.

WVMT’s transmitter power is 5,000 watts, as a Class B station, using a directional antenna with slightly different daytime and nighttime directional patterns in order to protect other stations on the AM 620 frequency, principally, WTMJ in Milwaukee. Its daytime signal covers most of Northern Vermont, Northeastern New York and part of Quebec, Canada. At night, the station adjusts its coverage to concentrate the signal around the Burlington and Plattsburgh, New York areas.  WVMT's easily identifiable three-tower array is shown on Lake Champlain navigation charts, located in Colchester, near Malletts Bay.

Programming
Weekdays begin with a local news and information show, The Morning Drive, hosted by Marcus Certa and Kurt Wright.  The rest of the weekday schedule is made up of nationally syndicated shows, Brian Kilmeade, Jimmy Failla, The Ramsey Show with Dave Ramsey, Jim Bohannon and Coast to Coast AM with George Noory.  Boston-based Howie Carr is heard on weekday afternoons.

Weekends feature shows on money, health, home repair, cars, pets, law, dining, wine and beer.  Weekend syndicated shows include Glenn Beck, At Home with Gary Sullivan, Bill Handel on the Law, The Pet Show with Warren Eckstein, Leo Laporte, The Tech Guy, Ron Annanian, The Car Doctor and Somewhere in Time with Art Bell.  WVMT carries New York Yankees Baseball games.  Most hours begin with ABC News Radio.

History

University of Vermont
WVMT is the oldest radio station in Vermont.  It began test transmissions on May 20, 1922.  The call sign was WCAX, and it was owned by the University of Vermont (UVM).

In its early years, WCAX largely operated on an experimental basis, and it was not until October 10, 1924, that the station formally signed on.  WCAX was run by UVM students and faculty.  Most of its programming consisting of farming information from the University's Extension Service.  Some reports say the call letters stood for "College of Agriculture Extension" in recognition of this service.

The station's license was granted, and the call letters assigned, on May 13, 1922. That assignment was around the same time as WCAU (now WPHT) in Philadelphia and WCAY (now WTMJ) in Milwaukee, so it is likely the station did not request the WCAX call sign.  Initially operating at 833 kHz (as most stations did at that time).  It moved to 1200 kHz by 1925, to 1190 kHz in 1926, to 1180 kHz in 1927, and then back to 1200 in November 1928.

Burlington Daily News
By 1931, the University of Vermont did not have the funds to continue its operation of WCAX, largely due to the need to purchase newer equipment required by the Federal Radio Commission.  On June 17 it sold the station to the Burlington Daily News. At that time, the newspaper was controlled by Dr. Horatio Nelson Jackson, the first person to drive across the country in a motor car.  The Daily News relaunched WCAX as a commercial station on November 4, 1931. However, under the terms of the sale, UVM continued to broadcast its programming on the station. On August 19, 1937, the station's tower was struck by lightning during a severe storm.  Charles Hasbrook bought WCAX and the Burlington Daily News in 1939.  The following year, the station joined the CBS Radio Network.  WCAX carried CBS dramas, comedies, news, sports, game shows, soap operas and big band broadcasts during the "Golden Age of Radio."

The North American Regional Broadcasting Agreement (NARBA) required the station to move to 1230 kilocycles in 1941. The following year, WCAX moved to its current frequency, 620 kHz.   Also in 1941, the Daily News was sold off.  But Hasbrook retained the station through the WCAX Broadcasting Corporation. (The 1230 frequency is now occupied by WJOY.)

Television station
A television station, Channel 3 WMVT, was launched on September 26, 1954.  It was renamed WCAX-TV two years later.  By 1960, WCAX Radio had switched from CBS to NBC Radio, even though WCAX-TV 3 remains a CBS TV network affiliate.  The two stations maintained one of Vermont's largest broadcast news departments.

WVMT
In 1963, Hasbrook sold WCAX to James Broadcasting, a company controlled by Simon Goldman, that also owned WJTN in Jamestown, New York.  The call letters for 620 AM were changed to WVMT.  (The previous call letters remain on WCAX-TV, which, until 2017; was owned by the family of Hasbrook's stepson, Stuart T. Martin Jr.)  From the 1960s through the 80s, WVMT had a middle-of-the-road music format.  The station had placed more of an emphasis on oldies by 1980, but largely remained middle-of-the-road. By 1984, the station had shifted to an adult contemporary format.  A few years later, in 1986, it also incorporated some oldies titles.  WVMT gained an FM sister station in 1990, when James Broadcasting purchased Top 40 outlet 95.5 WXXX from Atlantic Ventures.

By 1994, WVMT had shifted its music programming entirely to oldies, and had also incorporated some talk shows. By 1999, the station had formally moved to an all-talk format.  Paul Goldman's company, Sison Broadcasting, purchased WVMT and WXXX in 1997. WVMT and WXXX were sold to Vox AM/FM LLC in October 2018 pending FCC approval.  Vox took over the stations under a local marketing agreement (LMA) on January 1, 2019.

Translator

References

External links

Bing Bird's Eye View of Towers

VMT
Radio stations established in 1922
News and talk radio stations in the United States
1922 establishments in Vermont
Radio stations licensed before 1923 and still broadcasting